Silvestris  may refer to:
 Bernard Silvestris, a Medieval Platonist philosopher and poet of the 12th century

Species
 Felis silvestris, the European wildcat, a mammal species
 Malthonica silvestris, a spider species mostly found in caves or on dumps
 Pinus sylvestris, the Scots pine, a pine species

See also
 Sylvestris (disambiguation)